Porcius Festus was the 5th procurator of Judea from about 59 to 62, succeeding Antonius Felix.

Term in office
The exact time of Festus in office is not known. The earliest proposed date for the start of his term is c. 55–56, while the latest is 61.  These extremes have not gained much support and most scholars opt for a date between 58 and 60. F. F. Bruce says that, "The date of his [Felix's] recall and replacement by Porcius Festus is disputed, but a change in the provincial coinage of Judaea attested for Nero's fifth year points to A.D. 59"  Conybeare and Howson lay out an extended argument for the replacement taking place in 60.

Administration
Festus inherited the problems of his predecessor in regard to the Roman practice of creating civic privileges for Jews. Another issue that bedeviled his administration was the controversy between Herod Agrippa II and the priests in Jerusalem regarding the wall erected at the temple to break the view of the new wing of Agrippa's palace.

During his administration, Jewish hostility to Rome was greatly inflamed by the civic privileges issue. Feelings were aroused which played an important part in the closely following Jewish War of AD 66.

The Acts of the Apostles narrate that the Apostle Paul had his final hearing before Festus (Acts 24:27). In Acts 25:12, Festus sought to induce Paul to go to Jerusalem for trial; Paul appealed to the Emperor. The appeal resulted in Paul being sent to Rome for judgment by the Emperor himself although Festus had difficulty in detailing charges against him (Acts 25-26).

See also
 Gens Porcia
 Prefects, Procurators, and Legates of Roman Judaea
 List of biblical figures identified in extra-biblical sources
 Roman Procurator coinage

References

Porcii
Roman governors of Judaea
1st-century Romans
1st-century Roman governors of Judaea
Year of birth unknown
Year of death unknown
People in Acts of the Apostles